Parachtes is a genus of European woodlouse hunting spiders that was first described by P. Alicata in 1964.

Species
 it contains thirteen species:
Parachtes andreinii Alicata, 1966 – Italy
Parachtes cantabrorum (Simon, 1914) – Spain, France
Parachtes deminutus (Denis, 1957) – Spain
Parachtes ignavus (Simon, 1882) – Spain, France (mainland, Corsica)
Parachtes inaequipes (Simon, 1882) – France (Corsica)
Parachtes latialis Alicata, 1966 – Italy
Parachtes limbarae (Kraus, 1955) – Sardinia
Parachtes loboi Jiménez-Valverde, Barriga & Moreno, 2006 – Spain
Parachtes riberai Bosmans, 2017 – Spain (Majorca)
Parachtes romandiolae (Caporiacco, 1949) – Italy
Parachtes siculus (Caporiacco, 1949) – Italy
Parachtes teruelis (Kraus, 1955) – Spain
Parachtes vernae (Caporiacco, 1936) (type) – Italy

References

Araneomorphae genera
Dysderidae